Volkan Ünlü (born 8 July 1983) is a Turkish former professional footballer who played as a goalkeeper.

References

External links
 

1983 births
Living people
Sportspeople from Gelsenkirchen
German people of Turkish descent
Turkish footballers
German footballers
Footballers from North Rhine-Westphalia
Beşiktaş J.K. footballers
Çaykur Rizespor footballers
Sivasspor footballers
Association football goalkeepers
FC Schalke 04 players
MVV Maastricht players
SG Sonnenhof Großaspach players
KFC Uerdingen 05 players
Bundesliga players
Süper Lig players
Eerste Divisie players
German expatriate footballers
Turkish expatriate footballers
German expatriate sportspeople in Turkey
Expatriate footballers in Turkey
German expatriate sportspeople in the Netherlands
Turkish expatriate sportspeople in the Netherlands
Expatriate footballers in the Netherlands